Kazakhstan announced on 25 July 2018 that they would debut at the Junior Eurovision Song Contest 2018 to be held in Minsk, Belarus. The Kazakh broadcaster, Khabar Agency (KA), was responsible for the country's participation in the contest. A televised national selection process was held to select the Kazakh entry.

The 2018 contest marked the first time that Kazakhstan has participated in any Eurovision event.

Background

On 25 November 2017, Channel 31 of Kazakhstan revealed their intention to participate in the Junior Eurovision Song Contest 2018. Initial claims emerged on 22 December 2017 from both the Kazakh Minister of Culture and Sports, Arystanbek Mukhamediuly; and the Director General of Channel 31, Bagdat Kodzhahmetov; that Kazakhstan had applied to become a member of the EBU, with the hope of participating both in the Eurovision Song Contest and the Junior Eurovision Song Contest. Kodzhahmetov invited Daneliya Tuleshova, winner of the fourth season of Ukraine's version of The Voice Kids, to take part in the casting process to represent Kazakhstan in the Junior Eurovision Song Contest. The next day, however, the EBU made a statement the following day rejecting the possibility of Kazakhstan becoming an active member of the EBU, owing to the fact that Kazakhstan is neither within the European Broadcasting Area nor the Council of Europe.

Channel 31 also stated its intention to broadcast the contests in 2018 and 2019. Khabar Agency has been an associate member of the European Broadcasting Union (EBU) since January 2016.

Before Junior Eurovision

National final 
Kazakhstan's national final took on 22 September 2018. Ten songs participated in the competition and the winner was selected through a jury and public televote.

Competing entries 
Artists were able to submit their entries between 1 August 2018 and 31 August 2018. From all songs submitted, an eleven-member jury panel selected 10 songs for the competition. The jury panel consisted of Tamara Assar, Mariya Sadvakasova, Erke Esmahan, Kairat Nurtas, Roza Rymbaeva, Alan Azhibayev, Lyalla Sultankyzy, Renat Gaisin, Bagim Mukhitdenova, Meirambek Bespaev and Dimash Kudaibergenov.

Final
The final took place on 22 September 2018 at the Almaty Arena in Almaty, hosted by Maya Bekbaeva, Nursultan Qurman, Marat Oralgazin and Erkebulan Myrzabek. Ten competing acts participated in a televised production where the winner was determined by a 50/50 combination of votes from jury members made up of music professionals and a public telephone vote. The jury panel consisted of Tamara Assar, Mariya Sadvakasova, Erke Esmahan, Kairat Nurtas, Roza Rymbaeva, Alan Azhibayev, Lyalla Sultankyzy, Renat Gaisin, Bagim Mukhitdenova, Meirambek Bespaev and Dimash Kudaibergenov.

Artist and song information

Daneliya Tuleshova

Daneliya Tuleshova (born 18 July 2006) is a Kazakh child singer, also known as Da NeL. She represented Kazakhstan at the Junior Eurovision Song Contest 2018 in Minsk, Belarus, on 25 November 2018 with the song "Özıñe sen".

Tuleshova was born in the city of Astana and won the fourth season of The Voice Kids Ukraine.

Òzińe sen 
"Òzińe sen" or "Özıñe sen" is a song by Kazakh singer Daneliya Tuleshova. It is composed by Ivan Lopukhov and written by Artem Kuzmenkov, Kamila Dairova and Daneliya Tuleshova.

It represented Kazakhstan at the Junior Eurovision Song Contest 2018 in Minsk, Belarus. The song came in 6th place with 171 points.

At Junior Eurovision
During the opening ceremony and the running order draw which both took place on 19 November 2018, Kazakhstan was drawn to perform third on 25 November 2018, following Portugal and preceding Albania. She placed 6th, with 171 points.

Voting

Detailed voting results

References

Junior Eurovision Song Contest
Kazakhstan
2018